The 1967 Rothmans 12 Hour was an endurance race for Sports Racing Cars & Improved Production Cars.
The event was staged at the Surfers Paradise International Raceway in Queensland, Australia on 3 September 1967.

Class Structure
The 27 starters competed in four classes as follows:
 Sports Racing Cars Over 2000cc
 Sports Racing Cars Under 2000cc
 Improved Production Cars Over 2000cc
 Improved Production Cars Under 2000cc
This was the second of two Rothmans 12 Hour sports car races to be held at the Surfers Paradise circuit before the event was downsized to become the Surfers Paradise 6 Hour in 1968.

Results

References

Further reading
 A History Of Australian Motor Sport, 1980
 Australian Motor Racing Annual, 1968
 Modern Motor, November 1967, pages 98 & 99

External links
 Race report and images Retrieved from www.imca-slotracing.com on 17/6/08
 Ron Thorp AC Cobra images including 1967 Rothams 12 Hour Retrieved from www.bowdensown.com.au on 17/6/08

Motorsport at Surfers Paradise International Raceway
Rothmans 12 Hour